Sturmy is a surname. Notable people with the surname include:

William Sturmy (died 1427), English politician
Robert Sturmy, 15th-century beach merchant